Colegio Militar is a station on Line 2 of the Mexico City Metro system.  It is located in the Miguel Hidalgo borough of Mexico City, northwest of the city centre, on Calzada México-Tacuba. In 2019 the station had an average ridership of 15,275 passengers per day.

Name and pictogram
Colegio Militar means Military College and the station was named in reference to the Heroic Military College that existed in the vicinity of the Popotla neighborhood from 1920, when it was inaugurated by President Venustiano Carranza, until 1976, when it was moved to its current location in the south of Mexico City. 

The station's pictogram shows the stylised coat of arms of the Military Academy.

General information
The station opened on 14 September 1970 as part of the second stretch of Line 2, from Pino Suárez to Tacuba.

Colegio Militar serves the Colonia Anáhuac and Colonia Un Hogar para Nosotros neighborhood. The same facilities where the Military Academy once stood now house the Universidad del Ejército y Fuerza Aérea Mexicanos (Mexican Army and Air Force University).

From 2017 the station's walls have been covered with pictures depicting and honoring the Mexican Army and Air Force during their duty.

Ridership

Entrances
North: Calzada México-Tacuba, Colonia Un Hogar para Nosotros
Southwest: Calzada México-Tacuba and Felipe Carrillo Puerto street, Colonia Anáhuac
Southeast: Calzada México-Tacuba and Felipe Carrillo Puerto street, Colonia Anáhuac

See also
 List of Mexico City metro stations

References

External links

Colegio Militar
Railway stations opened in 1970
1970 establishments in Mexico
Mexico City Metro stations in Miguel Hidalgo, Mexico City
Railway stations in Mexico at university and college campuses